The following is a timeline of the COVID-19 pandemic in Uruguay during 2020.

Timeline

March
13 March 2020: The Ministry of Public Health confirmed the first four cases of coronavirus in Uruguay. Three had returned from Milan and one from Barcelona. Two of the four were in the Salto Department. The government declared a Health Crisis.

14 March 2020: Two more cases were confirmed. The number of patients rises to 6, while suspected cases increase to 200. By presidential decree, classes were canceled throughout the country for 14 days, as well as the activities of the University of the Republic and public shows. Partial border closure is decreed.

15 March 2020: 2 more cases are confirmed, one of them in the Maldonado Department; the most prominent was former minister and senator Pedro Bordaberry. In Salto there are 80 suspected cases in quarantine. All passengers on flights arriving from risk areas must complete forms for their 14-day mandatory isolation and subsequent control.

16 March 2020: The President of the Republic, Luis Lacalle Pou confirmed 21 new cases in the country. The number of infected people rises to 29. He also announced that the border with Argentina will be closed.

17 March 2020: The Secretary of the Presidency, Álvaro Delgado confirmed twenty-one new cases. The number of infected people rises to 50. Non-food product markets were restricted and the shopping malls were closed. The Pasteur Institute of Montevideo initiates support with the University of the Republic, to develop a national diagnostic test for coronavirus.

18 March 2020: 29 new cases are confirmed, as well as the presence of the virus in the Canelones and Colonia Departments. The number of infected people rises to 79, while suspected cases to 392.

19 March 2020: 15 new cases are confirmed, the number of infected people rises to 94. The suspension of classes was extended to 13 April. The government took some economic and social actions in order to help small and medium-sized companies, as well as homeless people. Chinese ambassador Wang Gang met with president Lacalle Pou to convey China's intention to provide supplies to help Uruguay fight the COVID-19 pandemic.

20 March 2020: 16 new cases are confirmed, the number of infected people rises to 110. It is announced that there are four hospitalized patients.

21 March 2020: 25 new cases are confirmed, the number of infected people rises to 135, two of them in ICU. Flores is reported to be on the list of infected departments and the Spanish Hospital will be prepared to be the first COVID-19 center in Uruguay. ANTEL declared free roaming service for those Uruguayans that are stranded. Also, a new Whatsapp number, +598 98 99 99 99, is available to answer any questions about COVID-19.

22 March 2020: 23 new cases are confirmed, the number of infected people rises to 158, one of them in ICU. There were 205 analyses: 182 negative results and 23 positive, three of them under 18 years old. 132 citizens returned from Peru, 16 from Buenos Aires and 6 from Bolivia. An ANTEL worker in Montevideo tested positive to COVID-19 analysis and due to this, the whole Telecommunications Tower's 6th floor was closed.

23 March 2020: Four new cases are confirmed, the number of infected people rises to 162, one of them in ICU and 2 in intermediate care. 211 analyses were made on the day.

24 March 2020: 27 new cases are confirmed, the number of infected people rises to 189, one of them in ICU and two in intermediate care. The first case in Rocha was confirmed. The government decrees the closing of borders to all foreigners  and informs that it will subsidize people over 65 who cannot work due to quarantine.

25 March 2020: 28 new cases are confirmed, the number of infected people rises to 217, four people in ICU, two in intermediate care, and 6 in low care. 320 analyses were made on the day. The first case in Soriano was confirmed.

26 March 2020: 21 new cases are confirmed, the number of infected people rises to 238, four people in ICU, two in intermediate care, and 6 in low care. 245 analyses were made on the day.

27 March 2020: 36 new cases are confirmed, the number of infected people rises to 274, four people in ICU, four in intermediate care, and 12 in low care. 451 analyses were made on the day.

28 March 2020: 30 new cases are confirmed, the number of infected people rises to 304, eight people in ICU, four in intermediate care, and 12 in low care. 372 analyses were made on the day. The country's first death from COVID-19 was confirmed, 71-year-old former minister of the Electoral Court Rodolfo González Rissotto.

29 March 2020: 6 new cases are confirmed, the number of infected people rises to 309, 10 people in ICU, two in intermediate care, and 12 in low care. 200 analyses were made on the day.

30 March 2020: 10 new cases are confirmed, the number of infected people rises to 320, 11 people in ICU, one in intermediate care, and 10 in low care. 298 analyses were made on the day. It was also reported that from the 320 cases, 25 are recoveries.

31 March 2020: 18 new cases are confirmed, the number of infected people rises to 338, 12 people in ICU and one in intermediate care. 394 analyses were made on the day. It was also reported that from the 338 cases, 41 are recoveries. The first case in Paysandu was confirmed.

April
1 April 2020: 12 new cases are confirmed, the number of infected people rises to 350, 15 people are in ICU. 289 analyses were made on the day. From the 350 cases, 62 are recoveries. The country's second death from COVID-19 was confirmed, a 61-year-old patient from Montevideo who had other underlying conditions.

2 April 2020: 19 new cases are confirmed, the number of infected people rises to 369, 13 people are in ICU. 356 analyses were made on the day. From the 369 cases, 68 are recoveries. The first case in Lavalleja was confirmed. Two more deaths from COVID-19 were confirmed in Montevideo, making a total of four deaths: a 65-year-old man and a 66-year-old woman, both had other underlying conditions. The woman had been infected at a religious gathering and the man at the Carrasco wedding attended by Uruguay's index case.

3 April 2020: 17 new cases are confirmed, the number of infected people rises to 386, 13 people are in ICU and one in intermediate care. 322 analyses were made on the day. From the 386 cases, 86 are recoveries. The first cases in Rivera and Rio Negro were confirmed.

4 April 2020: 14 new cases are confirmed, the number of infected people rises to 400, 13 people are in ICU. 277 analyses were made on the day. From the 400 cases, 93 are recoveries. The country's fifth death from COVID-19 was confirmed, a 53-year-old patient who had other underlying conditions.

5 April 2020: Six new cases are confirmed, the number of infected people rises to 406, 14 people are in ICU. 145 analyses were made on the day. From the 406 cases, 104 are recoveries. The country's sixth death from COVID-19 was confirmed, an 84-year-old patient from Montevideo who had other underlying conditions.

6 April 2020: Nine new cases are confirmed, the number of infected people rises to 415, 14 people are in ICU. 145 analyses were made on the day. From the 415 cases, 123 are recoveries.

7 April 2020: 9 new cases are confirmed, the number of infected people rises to 424, 14 people are in ICU. 342 analyses were made on the day. From the 424 cases, 150 are recoveries. The country's seventh death from COVID-19 was confirmed, an 84-year-old patient from Maldonado who had other underlying conditions.

8 April 2020: 32 new cases are confirmed, the number of infected people rises to 456, 14 people are in ICU. 448 analyses were made on the day. From the 456 cases, 192 are recoveries. The first case in San Jose was confirmed. Also it was mentioned that 22 of the new cases are a consequence of an outbreak in the Hospital Vilardebó

9 April 2020: 17 new cases are confirmed, the number of infected people rises to 473, 13 people are in ICU and 4 on intermediate care. 681 analyses were made on the day. From the 473 cases, 206 are recoveries.

10 April 2020: 21 new cases are confirmed, the number of infected people rises to 494, 15 people are in ICU. 640 analyses were made on the day. From the 494 cases, 214 are recoveries. The passengers of the Australian cruise ship Greg Mortimer, which was anchored off Montevideo's coast since March 27 with more than half its passengers and crew infected with the new coronavirus, were evacuated in order to be flown back to Australia.

11 April 2020: Seven new cases are confirmed, the number of infected people rises to 501, 16 people are in ICU and 1 on intermediate care. 618 analyses were made on the day. From the 501 cases, 224 are recoveries.

12 April 2020: Before this day, the official statements and the press were considering the positive tests as confirmed cases. Since then the confirmed cases are being informed apart from the positive tests. Due to that explanation, the number of infected people is 480, 231 are recoveries, 16 people are in ICU and no patients on intermediate care. 660 analyses were made on the day. Short time after the release of the report, the eighth death from COVID-19 was announced, a 69-year-old patient from Montevideo who did not have other underlying conditions.

13 April 2020: Three new cases are confirmed, the number of infected people rises to 483, 248 are recoveries, 15 people are in ICU and no patients on intermediate care. 462 analyses were made on the day.

14 April 2020: Nine new cases are confirmed, the number of infected people rises to 492, 260 are recoveries, 14 people are in ICU and no patients on intermediate care. 693 analyses were made on the day.

15 April 2020: One new case is confirmed, the number of infected people rises to 493, 272 are recoveries, 13 people are in ICU and no patients on intermediate care. 513 analyses were made on the day. The country's ninth COVID-19 death was confirmed, a 76-year-old man.

16 April 2020: Nine new cases are confirmed, the number of infected people rises to 502, 286 are recoveries, 13 people are in ICU and no patients on intermediate care. 791 analyses were made on the day. The first case in Durazno was confirmed.

17 April 2020: Six new cases are confirmed, the number of infected people rises to 508. 518 analyses were made on the day. President Luis Lacalle Pou informed that his administration decided to create a group, locally known as the GACH, made up of experts that will define methods and studies to advise the government. The experts will be: the mathematician, electrical engineer, and academic from the Latin American Academy of Sciences, Fernando Paganini; Dr. Rafael Radi, the first Uruguayan scientist at the National Academy of Sciences of the United States and president of the National Academy of Sciences of Uruguay; and Dr. Henry Cohen, President of the National Academy of Medicine and awarded as a Master by the World Gastroenterology Organisation in 2019.

18 April 2020: Nine new cases are confirmed, the number of infected people rises to 517, 298 are recoveries, 14 people are in ICU and no patients on intermediate care. 729 analyses were made on the day.

19 April 2020: 11 new cases are confirmed, the number of infected people rises to 528, 298 are recoveries, 13 people are in ICU and no patients on intermediate care. 348 analyses were made on the day. The country's tenth death from COVID-19 was confirmed, a 64-year-old man.

20 April 2020: Seven new cases are confirmed, the number of infected people rises to 535, 313 are recoveries, 13 people are in ICU and no patients on intermediate care. 570 analyses were made on the day.

21 April 2020: Eight new cases are confirmed, the number of infected people rises to 543, 324 are recoveries, 10 people are in ICU and no patients on intermediate care. 527 analyses were made on the day. The country's eleventh and twelfth deaths were confirmed, an Argentine citizen who resided in Maldonado and a 69-year-old patient from Montevideo. Both patients were in intensive care.

22 April 2020: Six new cases are confirmed, the number of infected people rises to 549, 337 are recoveries, 10 people are in ICU and no patients on intermediate care. 609 analyses were made on the day.

23 April 2020: 8 new cases are confirmed, the number of infected people rises to 557, 354 are recoveries, 10 people are in ICU and no patients on intermediate care. 610 analyses were made on the day. The use of face masks in supermarkets was made mandatory beginning April 24.

24 April 2020: 6 new cases are confirmed, the number of infected people rises to 563, 369 are recoveries, 12 patients have died, 10 people are in ICU and no patients on intermediate care. 692 analyses were made on the day.

25 April 2020: 33 new cases are confirmed, which is significantly higher than in previous days. This is due to an outbreak in a care home in Montevideo. The number of infected people rises to 596, 370 are recoveries, 9 people are in ICU and no patients on intermediate care. 662 analyses were made on the day.  Two more deaths were confirmed, raising the number to 14; a 75-year-old patient from Maldonado and a 93-year-old patient from Montevideo. The latter died in a care home in which all residents and staff members tested negative.

26 April 2020: 10 new cases are confirmed, the number of infected people rises to 606; 375 are recoveries, 10 people are in ICU and no patients on intermediate care. The 15th death was confirmed, a 93-year-old patient from Montevideo. 567 analyses were made on the day.

27 April 2020: 14 new cases are confirmed, the number of infected people rises to 620; 386 are recoveries, 11 people are in ICU and no patients on intermediate care. 442 analyses were made on the day.

28 April 2020: 5 new cases are confirmed, the number of infected people rises to 625; 394 are recoveries, 11 people are in ICU and no patients on intermediate care. 635 analyses were made on the day.

29 April 2020: 5 new cases are confirmed, the number of infected people rises to 630; 412 are recoveries, 11 people are in ICU and no patients on intermediate care. 876 analyses were made on the day.

30 April 2020: 13 new cases are confirmed, the number of infected people rises to 643; 417 are recoveries, 10 people are in ICU and no patients on intermediate care. Two more deaths were announced, a 93-year-old patient from Montevideo who died on April 29 and a 75-year-old patient from Maldonado who died on April 30. 731 analyses were made on the day.

May
1 May 2020: 5 new cases are confirmed, the number of infected people rises to 648; 435 are recoveries, 10 people are in ICU and no patients on intermediate care. 807 analyses were made on the day.

2 May 2020: 4 new cases are confirmed, the number of infected people rises to 652; 440 are recoveries, 10 people are in ICU and no patients on intermediate care. 610 analyses were made on the day.

3 May 2020: 3 new cases are confirmed, the number of infected people rises to 655; 442 are recoveries, 10 people are in ICU and no patients on intermediate care. 775 analyses were made on the day.

4 May 2020: 2 new cases are confirmed, the number of infected people rises to 657; 447 are recoveries, 10 people are in ICU and no patients on intermediate care. 866 analyses were made on the day. A total of 434 tests were carried out on the construction workers. The test, which was carried out randomly and covered the entire country, did not record positive cases of COVID-19. On the day, in addition, shops were reopened in the city centre of Montevideo, mainly on 18 de Julio Avenue.

5 May 2020: 13 new cases are confirmed, the number of infected people rises to 670; 468 are recoveries, 10 people are in ICU and no patients on intermediate care. 1,006 analyses were made on the day.

6 May 2020: 3 new cases are confirmed, the number of infected people rises to 673; 486 are recoveries, 10 people are in ICU and no patients on intermediate care. 845 analyses were made on the day.

7 May 2020: 11 new cases are confirmed, the number of infected people rises to 684; 492 are recoveries, 9 people are in ICU and no patients on intermediate care. 1,042 analyses were made on the day.

8 May 2020: 10 new cases are confirmed, the number of infected people rises to 694; 506 are recoveries, 8 people are in ICU and no patients on intermediate care. 1,140 tests were made on the day. The country's eighteenth death from COVID-19 was confirmed, a 49-year-old patient from Montevideo who had other underlying conditions. Minister of Economy, Azucena Arbeleche informed that the government had agreed with merchants, intermediaries and producers, the voluntary price controls for three months of the basic basket of food, hygiene and sanitation.

9 May 2020: 8 new cases are confirmed, the number of infected people rises to 702; 513 are recoveries, 9 people are in ICU and no patients on intermediate care. 623 analyses were made on the day.

10 May 2020: 5 new cases are confirmed, the number of infected people rises to 707; 517 are recoveries, 8 people are in ICU and no patients on intermediate care. 563 analyses were made on the day. An 85-year-old patient from Montevideo died on this day, bringing the total death toll to 19.

11 May 2020: 4 new cases are confirmed, the number of infected people rises to 711; 523 are recoveries, 8 people are in ICU and no patients on intermediate care. 673 analyses were made on the day.

12 May 2020: 6 new cases are confirmed, the number of infected people rises to 717; 532 are recoveries, 8 people are in ICU and no patients on intermediate care. 803 analyses were made on the day.

13 May 2020: 2 new cases are confirmed, the number of infected people rises to 719; 545 are recoveries, 8 people are in ICU and no patients on intermediate care. 709 analyses were made on the day.

14 May 2020: 5 new cases are confirmed, the number of infected people rises to 724; 547 are recovered, 7 people are in ICU and no patients on intermediate care. 1,000 analyses were made on the day.

15 May 2020: 8 new cases are confirmed, the number of infected people rises to 732; 553 are recoveries, 7 people are in ICU and no patients on intermediate care. 1,016 analyses were made on the day.

16 May 2020: 1 new case is confirmed, the number of infected people rises to 733; 558 are recoveries, 5 people are in ICU and no patients on intermediate care. 870 analyses were made on the day.

17 May 2020: 1 new case is confirmed, the number of infected people rises to 734; 564 are recoveries, 4 people are in ICU and no patients on intermediate care. 825 analyses were made on the day. A new death by COVID-19 is confirmed, a 76-year-old man from Montevideo, the number of deceased rises to 20.

18 May 2020: Three new cases are confirmed, the number of infected people rises to 737; 569 are recoveries, 4 people are in ICU and no patients on intermediate care. 523 analyses were made on the day.

19 May 2020: One new case is confirmed, the number of infected people rises to 738; 579 are recoveries, 4 people are in ICU and no patients on intermediate care. 410 analyses were made on the day. The first case in Artigas was confirmed.

20 May 2020: 8 new cases are confirmed, the number of infected people rises to 746; 588 are recoveries, 4 people are in ICU and no patients on intermediate care. 836 analyses were made on the day.

21 May 2020: Three new cases are confirmed, the number of infected people rises to 749; 594 are recoveries, 5 people are in ICU and no patients on intermediate care. 907 analyses were made on the day. President Lacalle Pou announced that face-to-face classes would resume on three different dates, depending on the level of education. It was also reported that attendance would be voluntary.

22 May 2020: 4 new cases are confirmed, the number of infected people rises to 753; 603 are recoveries, five people are in ICU and no patients on intermediate care. 641 analyses were made on the day.

23 May 2020: 11 new cases are confirmed, the number of infected people rises to 764, 616 are recoveries, five people are in ICU and no patients on intermediate care. 412 analyses were made on the day. 2 deaths from COVID-19 were confirmed, a 76-year-old patient and a 90-year-old patient, both in the Rivera Department. Moreover, 9 of the confirmed cases were in that department.

24 May 2020: Five new cases are confirmed, the number of infected people rises to 769, 618 are recoveries, five people are in ICU and no patients on intermediate care. 556 analyses were made on the day.

25 May 2020: 18 new cases are confirmed, the number of infected people rises to 787, 629 are recoveries, five people are in ICU and no patients on intermediate care. 549 analyses were made on the day. A new outbreak was detected in Rivera with 29 active cases registered to date.

26 May 2020: 2 new cases are confirmed, the number of infected people rises to 789, 638 are recoveries, five people are in ICU and no patients on intermediate care. 774 analyses were made on the day. Random testing was started in Rivera to gauge the state of herd immunity and the extent of the current outbreak.

27 May 2020: 14 new cases are confirmed, the number of infected people rises to 803, 650 are recoveries, five people are in ICU and no patients on intermediate care. 760 analyses were made on the day. Eight new cases were detected in Rivera, furthering the extent of the outbreak in the department which now has the highest number of active cases outside Montevideo.

28 May 2020: 8 new cases are confirmed, the number of infected people rises to 811, 654 are recoveries, five people are in ICU and no patients on intermediate care. 1,240 analyses were made on the day. The first case in Cerro Largo was confirmed.

29 May 2020: Five new cases are confirmed, the number of infected people rises to 816, 680 are recoveries, six people are in ICU and no patients on intermediate care. 1,155 analyses were made on the day. President Lacalle Pou, the Secretary of the Presidency, the Minister of National Defense, the President's private secretary and the ASSE President began a quarantine while awaiting the test, after it was confirmed that the director of the Ministry of Social Development in Rivera was infected with COVID-19. The contact occurred after a visit by the President and members of the government to the northern city of Rivera, where they held a meeting with local authorities.

30 May 2020: 5 new cases are confirmed, the number of infected people rises to 821, 682 are recoveries, five people are in ICU and no patients on intermediate care. 855 analyses were made on the day. After being tested, it was confirmed that neither President Lacalle nor any government officer had been infected.

31 May 2020: Two new cases are confirmed, the number of infected people rises to 823, 685 are recoveries, five people are in ICU and no patients on intermediate care. 432 analyses were made on the day.

June
1 June 2020: Two new cases are confirmed, the number of infected people rises to 825, 689 are recoveries, four people are in ICU and no patients on intermediate care. 600 analyses were made on the day. One new death from COVID-19 was confirmed, a 63-year-old patient from Montevideo, raising the total number of deaths to 23.

2 June 2020: One new case is confirmed, the number of infected people rises to 826, 691 are recoveries, four people are in ICU and no patients on intermediate care. 715 analyses were made on the day. Rivera surpassed Montevideo as the department with the highest number of active cases.

3 June 2020: 2 new cases are confirmed, 698 are recoveries, 4 people are in ICU and no patients on intermediate care. 551 analyses were made on the day. For the first time since the health emergency was announced, no positive cases were confirmed from the number of analyses made on the day.

4 June 2020: 4 new cases are positive, the number of infected people rises to 832, 709 are recoveries, 4 people are in ICU and no patients on intermediate care. 735 analyses were made on the day.

5 June 2020: 2 new cases are confirmed, the number of infected people rises to 834, 721 are recoveries, 4 people are in ICU and no patients on intermediate care. 921 analyses were made on the day.

6 June 2020: 11 new cases are confirmed, the number of infected people rises to 845, 726 are recoveries, 4 people are in ICU and no patients on intermediate care. 596 analyses were made on the day.

7 June 2020: No new cases are confirmed for the first time since the health emergency was declared. The number of infected people remains steady at 845, 730 positive cases are confirmed to have recovered, 4 people are in ICU and no patients on intermediate care. 403 analyses were made on the day.

8 June 2020: No new cases are confirmed for the second day in a row. The number of infected people remains steady at 845, 738 positive cases are confirmed to have recovered, 4 people are in ICU and no patients on intermediate care. 464 analyses were made on the day.

9 June 2020: 1 new case is confirmed. The number of infected people rises to 846, 754 are recoveries, 4 people are in ICU and no patients on intermediate care. 757 analyses were made on the day. Shopping centers across the country were reopened, on a reduced schedule.

10 June 2020: 1 new case is confirmed. The number of infected people rises to 847, 758 are recoveries, 4 people are in ICU and no patients on intermediate care. 820 analyses were made on the day.

11 June 2020: No new cases are confirmed. The number of infected people remains steady in 847, 772 are recoveries, 4 people are in ICU and no patients on intermediate care. 840 analyses were made on the day.

12 June 2020: No new cases are confirmed for the second day in a row. The number of infected people remains steady at 847, 780 are recoveries, 3 people are in ICU and no patients on intermediate care. 765 analyses were made on the day.

13 June 2020: No new cases are confirmed for the third day in row. The number of infected people remains steady at 847, 784 are recoveries, 3 people are in ICU and no patients on intermediate care. 784 analyses were made on the day.

14 June 2020: 1 new case is confirmed. The number of infected people rises to 848, 788 are recoveries, 3 people are in ICU and no patients on intermediate care. 403 analyses were made on the day.

15 June 2020: No new cases are confirmed. The number of infected people remains at 848, 792 are recoveries, 3 people are in ICU and no patients on intermediate care. 460 analyses were made on the day. The new case announced on June 14 was revealed to have occurred in Tacuarembó, which makes it the first case in this department.

16 June 2020: 1 new case is confirmed. The number of infected people rises to 849, 801 are recoveries, 3 people are in ICU and no patients on intermediate care. 761 analyses were made on the day. The death of a crew member of the Greg Mortimer from the Philippines was added to the total, which rises to 24. Until this day, his death was not registered due to legal reasons.

17 June 2020: No new cases is confirmed. The number of infected people remains steady to 849, 810 are recoveries, 4 people are in ICU and no patients on intermediate care. 729 analyses were made on the day.

18 June 2020: 1 new case is confirmed. The number of infected people rises to 850, 814 are recoveries, 4 people in ICU and no patients on intermediate care. 681 analyses were made on the day.

19 June 2020: 3 new cases are confirmed. The number of infected people rises to 853, 814 are recoveries, 4 people in ICU and no patients on intermediate care. 338 analyses were made on the day.

20 June 2020: 6 new cases are confirmed. The number of infected people rises to 859, 815 are recoveries, 4 people in ICU and no patients on intermediate care. 643 analyses were made on the day. The death of an 84-year-old patient from Montevideo was confirmed, raising the total number of deaths to 25.

21 June 2020: 17 new cases are confirmed, 12 of which are in the Treinta y Tres Department. The number of infected people rises to 876. The number of recoveries has been revised down to 814. Four patients are in ICU and no patients are on intermediate care. 412 analyses were made on the day.

22 June 2020: 6 new cases are confirmed. The number of infected people rises to 882. The number of recoveries remains at 815, 4 patients are in ICU and no patients are on intermediate care. 398 analyses were made on the day.

23 June 2020: 3 new cases are confirmed. The number of infected people rises to 885. The number of recoveries remains at 815, 4 patients are in ICU and no patients are on intermediate care. 1,158 analyses were made on the day.

24 June 2020: 17 new cases are confirmed, all in the Treinta y Tres Department. The number of infected people rises to 902. The number of recoveries remains at 815, 2 patients are in ICU and no patients are on intermediate care. 1,473 analyses were made on the day. The death of a 69-year-old patient from Rivera was confirmed, raising the total number of deaths to 26.

25 June 2020: 5 new cases are confirmed. The number of infected people rises to 907. The number of recoveries is 818, 2 patients are in ICU and no patients are on intermediate care. 1,290 analyses were made on the day.

26 June 2020: 12 new cases are confirmed. The number of infected people rises to 919. The number of recoveries is 818, 2 patients are in ICU and no patients are on intermediate care. 1,157 analyses were made on the day.

27 June 2020: 5 new cases are confirmed. The number of infected people rises to 924. The number of recoveries remains at 818, 2 patients are in ICU and no patients are on intermediate care. 1,418 analyses were made on the day.

28 June 2020: 5 new cases are confirmed. The number of infected people rises to 929. The number of recoveries remains at 818, 2 patients are in ICU and no patients are on intermediate care. 403 analyses were made on the day. The death of a 64-year-old patient from Treinta y Tres was confirmed, raising the total number of deaths to 27.

29 June 2020: 3 new cases are confirmed. The number of infected people rises to 932. The number of recoveries rises to 822, 2 patients are in ICU and no patients are on intermediate care. 1,040 analyses were made on the day.

30 June 2020: 4 new cases are confirmed. The number of infected people rises to 936. The number of recoveries rises to 824, 2 patients are in ICU and no patients are on intermediate care. 674 analyses were made on the day.

July
1 July 2020: 7 new cases are confirmed. The number of infected people rises to 943. The number of recoveries rises to 825, 1 patient is in ICU and no patients are on intermediate care. 1,233 analyses were made on the day. The death of a 64-year-old Brazilian national who was hospitalized in Salto was confirmed. The total number of deaths to date is 28.

2 July 2020: 4 new cases are confirmed. The number of infected people rises to 947. The number of recoveries rises to 828, 1 patient is in ICU and no patients are on intermediate care. 916 analyses were made on the day.

3 July 2020: 5 new cases are confirmed. The number of infected people rises to 952. The number of recoveries rises to 837, 1 patient is in ICU and no patients are on intermediate care. 1,121 analyses were made on the day.

4 July 2020: 3 new cases are confirmed. The number of infected people rises to 955. The number of recoveries rises to 840, 1 patient is in ICU and no patients are on intermediate care. 912 analyses were made on the day

5 July 2020: 1 new case is confirmed. The number of infected people rises to 956. The number of recoveries rises to 849, 1 patient is in ICU and no patients are on intermediate care. 963 analyses were made on the day.

6 July 2020: 4 new cases are confirmed. The number of infected people rises to 960. The number of recoveries rises to 858, no patients are in ICU and no patients are on intermediate care. The death of a 70-year-old woman in Montevideo was also confirmed. The total number of deaths to date is 29. 984 analyses were made on the day.

7 July 2020: 5 new cases are confirmed. The number of infected people rises to 965. The number of recoveries rises to 865, no patients are in ICU and no patients are on intermediate care. 1,216 analyses were made on the day.

8 July 2020: 9 cases are confirmed. The number of infected people rises to 974. The number of recoveries rises to 871, no patients are in ICU and no patients are on intermediate care. 959 analyses were made on the day.

9 July 2020: 3 new cases are confirmed. The number of infected people rises to 977, 878 are recoveries, 1 patient is in ICU and no patients on intermediate care. 1,467 analyses were made on the day.

10 July 2020: 8 new cases are confirmed. The number of infected people rises to 985. The number of recoveries rises to 886, 1 patient is in ICU and no patients are on intermediate care. 1,224 analyses were made on the day.

11 July 2020: 1 new case is confirmed. The number of infected people rises to 986. The number of recoveries rises to 896, no patients are in ICU and no patients are on intermediate care. 858 analyses were made on the day. An 86-year-old patient from Cerro Largo was confirmed as the 30th death of COVID-19 since the beginning of the pandemic.

12 July 2020: 1 new case is confirmed. The number of infected people rises to 987. The number of recoveries remains at 896, no patients are in ICU and no patients are on intermediate care. 469 analyses were made on the day. The death of an 87-year-old patient from Soriano was confirmed, raising the total number of deaths to 31.

13 July 2020: 2 new cases are confirmed. The number of infected people rises to 989. The number of recoveries rises to 903, no patients are in ICU and no patients are on intermediate care. 1,377 analyses were made on the day.

14 July 2020: 8 new cases are confirmed, in an outbreak occurred in the Médica Uruguaya health center of Montevideo. The number of infected people rises to 997. The number of recoveries rises to 905, no patients are in ICU and no patients are on intermediate care. 1483 analyses were made on the day.

15 July 2020: 12 new cases are confirmed, 10 of them due to the outbreak in the Médica Uruguaya health center, with 205 people in isolation. The number of infected people rises to 1,009. The number of recoveries rises to 909, 1 patient is in ICU and no patients are on intermediate care. 1,326 analyses were made on the day.

16 July 2020: 17 new cases are confirmed, 15 of them due to the outbreak in the Médica Uruguaya health center. The number of infected people rises to 1,026. The number of recoveries rises to 916, 3 patients are in ICU and no patients are on intermediate care. 1,517 analyses were made on the day. The death of a 58-year-old woman in Montevideo was also confirmed, raising the total number of deaths to 32.

17 July 2020: 11 new cases are confirmed. The number of infected people rises to 1,037. The number of recoveries rises to 917, 3 patients are in ICU and no patients are on intermediate care. 1,719 analyses were made on the day.

18 July 2020: 7 new cases are confirmed. The number of infected people rises to 1,044. The number of recoveries rises to 921, 3 patients are in ICU and no patients are on intermediate care. 1,346 analyses were made on the day. The death of a 74-year-old woman in Canelones was also confirmed, raising the total number of deaths to 33.

19 July 2020: 10 new cases are confirmed. The number of infected people rises to 1,054. The number of recoveries rises to 922, 3 patients are in ICU and no patients are on intermediate care. 1,262 analyses were made on the day.

20 July 2020: 10 new cases are confirmed. The number of infected people rises to 1,064. The number of recoveries rises to 927, 3 patients are in ICU and no patients are on intermediate care. 2,033 analyses were made on the day.

21 July 2020: 32 new cases are confirmed. The number of infected people rises to 1,096. The number of recoveries rises to 929, 4 patients are in ICU and no patients are on intermediate care. 1,407 analyses were made on the day. President Lacalle Pou announced that all the people who would be hospitalized in Montevideo and Canelones would be tested. In addition, the visa request for foreigners transiting the country was also announced.

22 July 2020: 21 new cases are confirmed. The number of infected people rises to 1,117. The number of recoveries rises to 934, 3 patients are in ICU and no patients are on intermediate care. 3,100 analyses were made on the day. The death of a 74-year-old man in Treinta y Tres was also confirmed, raising the total number of deaths to 34.

23 July 2020: 24 new cases are confirmed. The number of infected people rises to 1,141. The number of recoveries rises to 940, 3 patients are in ICU and no patients are on intermediate care. 2316 analyses were made on the day.

24 July 2020: 25 new cases are confirmed. The number of infected people rises to 1,166. The number of recoveries rises to 946, 3 patients are in ICU and no patients are on intermediate care. 2,100 analyses were made on the day.

25 July 2020: 9 new cases are confirmed. The number of infected people rises to 1,174. The number of recoveries rises to 947, 3 patients are in ICU and no patients are on intermediated care. 1,488 analyses were made on the day.

26 July 2020: 18 new cases are confirmed. The number of infected people rises to 1,192. The number of recoveries rises to 948, 5 patients are in ICU and no patients are on intermediated care. 1,943 analyses were made on the day.

27 July 2020: 13 new cases are confirmed. The number of infected people rises to 1,202. The number of recoveries rises to 951, 5 patients are in ICU and no patients are on intermediated care. 1,955 analyses were made on the day. The death of a 68-year-old man in Montevideo was also confirmed, raising the total number of deaths to 35.

28 July 2020: 20 new cases are confirmed. The number of infected people rises to 1,018, this difference is explained by 4 infected people (3 from Cerro Largo and 1 from Rocha) being foreigners who are currently outside the national territory. The number of recoveries rises to 958, 7 patients are in ICU and no patients are on intermediated care. 2,363 analyses were made on the day.

29 July 2020: 19 new cases are confirmed, 5 of them due to an outbreak in the city of Bella Unión. The number of infected people rises to 1,237. The number of recoveries rises to 967, 6 patients are in ICU and no patients are on intermediated care. 1,990 analyses were made on the day.

30 July 2020: 6 new cases are confirmed. The number of infected people rises to 1,243. The number of recoveries rises to 978, 5 patients are in ICU and no patients are on intermediate care. 1,640 analyses were made on the day.

31 July 2020: 21 new cases are confirmed. The number of infected people rises to 1,264. The number of recoveries rises to 994, 5 patients are in ICU and no patients are on intermediate care. 2,586 analyses were made on the day.

August 
1 August 2020: 14 new cases are confirmed. The number of infected people rises to 1,278. The number of recoveries rises to 1,004, 5 patients are in ICU and no patients are on intermediate care. 1,663 analyses were made on the day.

2 August 2020: 8 new cases are confirmed. The number of infected people rises to 1,286. The number of recoveries rises to 1,011, 4 patients are in ICU and no patients are on intermediate care. 1,853 analyses were made on the day. The death of a 79-year-old man in Rivera was also confirmed, raising the total number of deaths to 36.

3 August 2020: 9 new cases are confirmed. The number of infected people rises to 1,291. The number of recoveries rises to 1,023, 4 patients are in ICU and no patients are on intermediate care. 1,989 analyses were made on the day. There are two fewer cases than the previous day in Cerro Largo and one less in Soriano because the patients are foreigners who are currently outside the national territory. In addition, on the day the theaters and museums were reopened.

4 August 2020: 12 new cases are confirmed. The number of infected people rises to 1,300. The number of recoveries rises to 1,048, 3 patients are in ICU and no patients are on intermediate care. 3,254 analyses were made on the day. The death of a 62-year-old man in Montevideo was also confirmed, raising the total number of deaths to 37.

5 August 2020: 11 new cases are confirmed. The number of infected people rises to 1,309, this difference is explained by 2 infected people being foreigners who are currently outside the national territory. The number of recoveries rises to 1,065, 3 patients are in ICU and no patients are on intermediate care. 1,802 analyses were made on the day.

6 August 2020: 9 new cases are confirmed. The number of infected people rises to 1,318. The number of recoveries rises to 1,079, 2 patients are in ICU and no patients are on intermediate care. 2,858 analyses were made on the day.

7 August 2020: 7 new cases are confirmed. The number of infected people rises to 1,325. The number of recoveries rises to 1,095, 2 patients are in ICU and no patients are on intermediate care. 1,858 analyses were made on the day.

8 August 2020: 13 new cases are confirmed. The number of infected people rises to 1,335, this difference is explained by the laboratory validation having showed that 3 cases were mistakenly reported as positive. The number of recoveries rises to 1,112, 3 patients are in ICU and no patients are on intermediate care. 1,953 analyses were made on the day.

9 August 2020: 18 new cases are confirmed. The number of infected people rises to 1,353. The number of recoveries rises to 1,125, 5 patients are in ICU and no patients are on intermediate care. 1,069 analyses were made on the day.

10 August 2020: 11 new cases are confirmed. The number of infected people rises to 1,364. The number of recoveries rises 1,146, 4 patients are in ICU and no patients are on intermediate care. 1,401 analyses were made on the day.

11 August 2020: 21 new cases are confirmed. The number of infected people rises to 1,385. The number of recoveries rises to 1,157, 5 patients are in ICU and no patients are on intermediate care. 2,192 analyses were made on the day.

12 August 2020: 9 new cases are confirmed. The number of infected people rises to 1,393, this difference is explained by an infected person being a foreigner who is currently outside the national territory. The number of recoveries rises to 1,163, 5 patients are in ICU and no patients are on intermediate care. 1,757 analyses were made on the day.

13 August 2020: 16 new cases are confirmed. The number of infected people rises to 1,409. The number of recoveries rises to 1,180, 5 patients are in ICU and no patients are on intermediate care. 1,514 analyses were made on the day.

14 August 2020: 13 new cases are confirmed. The number of infected people rises to 1,421, this difference is explained by an infected person being a foreigner who is currently outside the national territory. The number of recoveries rises to 1,182, 4 patients are in ICU and no patients are on intermediate care. 3,899 analyses were made on the day. The death of a 73-year-old man in Montevideo was also confirmed, raising the total number of deaths to 38.

15 August 2020: 15 new cases are confirmed. The number of infected people rises to 1,434, this difference is explained by two infected people being foreigners who are currently outside the national territory. The number of recoveries rises to 1,194, 4 patients are in ICU and no patients are on intermediate care. 1,629 analyses were made on the day.

16 August 2020: 6 new cases are confirmed. The number of infected people rises to 1,440. The number of recoveries rises to 1,200, 4 patients are in ICU and no patients are on intermediate care. 2,038 analyses were made on the day.

17 August 2020: 17 new cases are confirmed. The number of infected people rises to 1,457. The number of recoveries rises to 1,205, 3 patients are in ICU and no patients are on intermediate care. 1,328 analyses were made on the day. The deaths of an 81-year-old woman and a 51-year-old man, both in Montevideo were also  confirmed, raising the total number of deaths to 40.

18 August 2020: 28 new cases are confirmed. The number of infected people rises to 1,485. The number of recoveries rises to 1,219, 4 patients are in ICU and no patients on intermediate care. 2,492 analyses were made on the day.

19 August 2020: 9 new cases are confirmed. The number of infected people rises to 1,493, this difference is explained by an infected person being a foreigner who is currently outside the national territory. The number of recoveries rises to 1,228, 5 patients are in ICU and no patients on intermediate care. 2,035 analyses were made on the day.

20 August 2020: 13 new cases are confirmed. The number of infected people rises to 1,506. The number of recoveries rises to 1,242, 3 patients are in ICU and no patients are on intermediate care. 2,310 analyses were made on the day. The death of a 67-year-old man in Canelones was also confirmed, raising the total number of deaths to 41.

21 August 2020: 10 new cases are confirmed. The number of infected people rises to 1,516. The number of recoveries rises to 1,249, 2 patients are in ICU, and no patients on intermediate care. 2,192 analyses were made on the day.  The death of a 71-year-old man in Montevideo was also confirmed, raising the total number of deaths to 42.

22 August 2020: 6 new cases are confirmed. The number of infected people rises to 1,521, this difference is explained by an infected person being a foreigner who is currently outside the national territory. The number of recoveries rises to 1,264, 2 people are in ICU and no patients are on intermediate care. 2,079 analyses were made on the day.

23 August 2020: 6 new cases are confirmed. The number of infected people rises to 1,527. The number of recoveries rises to 1,276, 2 patients are in ICU, and no patients on intermediate care. 1,512 analyses were made on the day.

24 August 2020: 6 new cases are confirmed. The number of infected people rises to 1,533. The number of recoveries rises to 1,295, 4 patients are in ICU and no patients on intermediate care. 1,421 analyses were made on the day. Due to the celebration of Nostalgia Night, in which a number of parties are organized in discos and nightclubs, the Uruguayan government launched an advertising campaign urging the population to stay at home, in order to avoid massive infections. The holding of parties were prohibited and police operations were carried out throughout the country.  The creator of the celebration, Pablo Lecueder, joined the campaign stating "We are going to do Nostalgia Night, but no party."

25 August 2020: 3 new cases are confirmed. The number of infected people rises to 1,536. The number of recoveries rises to 1,309, 4 patients are in ICU and no patients on intermediate care. 1,492 analyses were made on the day. The death of a 96-year-old woman in Montevideo was also confirmed, raising the total number of deaths to 43.

26 August 2020: 7 new cases are confirmed. The number of infected people rises to 1,543. The number of recoveries rises to 1,322, 4 patients are in ICU and no patients on intermediate care. 1,609 analyses were made on the day.

27 August 2020: 9 new cases are confirmed. The number of infected people rises to 1,551, this difference is explained by an infected person being a foreigner who is currently outside the national territory. The number of recoveries rises to 1,333, 3 patients are in ICU and no patients on intermediate care. 1,379 analyses were made on the day.

28 August 2020: 8 new cases are confirmed. The number of infected people rises to 1,556, which is three less than the previous cumulative number due to three infected people being foreigners who left the national territory. The number of recoveries rises to 1,352, 3 patients are in ICU and no patients are on intermediate care. 1,599 analyses were made on the day.

29 August 2020: 14 new cases are confirmed. The number of infected people rises to 1,570. The number of recoveries rises to 1,364, 3 patients are in ICU and no patients are on intermediate care. 3,521 analyses were made on the day. The death of a 92-year-old man was also confirmed, raising the total number of deaths to 44.

30 August 2020: 15 new cases are confirmed. The number of infected people rises to 1,585. The number of recoveries rises to 1,378, 3 patients are in ICU and no patients are on intermediate care. 844 analyses were made on the day.

31 August 2020: 11 new cases are confirmed. The number of infected people rises to 1,595, which is one less than the previous cumulative number due to one infected person being a truck driver from abroad who tested positive in Uruguay and later left the national territory. The number of recoveries rises to 1,409. Three patients are in ICU and no patients are on intermediate care. 1,106 analyses were made on the day.

September  
1 September 2020: 16 new cases are confirmed. The number of infected people rises to 1,611. The number of recoveries rises to 1,419. Three patients are in ICU and no patients are on intermediate care. 1,893 analyses were made on the day. The first case ever in the Florida Department was confirmed, making it the last Uruguayan department to have confirmed at least one case of coronavirus since the beginning of the pandemic.

2 September 2020: 16 new cases are confirmed. The number of infected people rises to 1,626, which is one less than the previous cumulative number due to one infected person being a truck driver from abroad who tested positive in Uruguay and later left the national territory. The number of recoveries rises to 1,433. Three patients are in ICU and no patients are on intermediate care. 1,901 analyses were made on the day.

3 September 2020: 13 new cases are confirmed. The number of infected people rises to 1,636, which is three less than the previous cumulative number due to three infected people being truck drivers from abroad who tested positive in Uruguay and later left the national territory. The number of recoveries rises to 1,437. Three patients are in ICU and no patients are on intermediate care. 1,648 analyses were made on the day.

4 September 2020: 17 new cases are confirmed. The number of infected people rises to 1,653. The number of recoveries rises to 1,446. Two patients are in ICU and no patients are on intermediate care. 2,110 analyses were made on the day. The death of a 69-year-old patient in Montevideo was also confirmed, raising the total number of deaths to 45.

5 September 2020: 18 new cases are confirmed. The number of infected people rises to 1,669, which is two less than the previous cumulative number due to two infected people being truck drivers from abroad who tested positive in Uruguay and later left the national territory. The number of recoveries rises to 1,459. 3 patients are in ICU and no patients are on intermediate care. 3,167 analyses were made on the day.

6 September 2020: 11 new cases are confirmed. The number of infected people rises to 1,679, which is one less than the previous cumulative number due to one infected person being a truck driver from abroad who tested positive in Uruguay and later left the national territory. The number of recoveries remains at 1,459. 3 patients are in ICU and no patients are on intermediate care. 1,804 analyses were made on the day.

7 September 2020: 14 new cases are confirmed. The number of infected people rises to 1,693. The number of recoveries rises to 1,466, 3 patients are in ICU and no patients are on intermediate care. 1,773 analyses were made on the day.

8 September 2020: 19 new cases are confirmed. The number of infected people rises to 1,712. The number of recoveries rises to 1,476, 2 patients are in ICU and no patients on intermediate care. 1,753 analyses were made on the day.

9 September 2020: 31 new cases are confirmed, 10 of them are military personnel who returned from a peacekeeping mission in the Democratic Republic of Congo. The number of infected people rises to 1,741, which is two less than the previous cumulative number due to two infected people being foreigners who tested positive in Uruguay and later left the national territory. The number of recoveries rises to 1,478, 2 patients are in ICU and no patients are on intermediate care. 1,720 analyses were made on the day.

10 September 2020: 18 new cases are confirmed. The number of infected people rises to 1,759. The number of recoveries rises to 1,484, 1 patient is in ICU and no patients are on intermediate care. 2,222 analyses were made on the day.

11 September 2020: 15 new cases are confirmed. The number of infected people rises to 1,773, which is two less than the previous cumulative number due to one infected person being a foreigner who tested positive in Uruguay and later left the national territory. The number of recoveries rises to 1,490, 1 patient is in ICU and no patients are on intermediate care. 2,621 analyses were made on the day.

12 September 2020: 7 new cases are confirmed. The number of infected people rises to 1,780. The number of recoveries rises to 1,502, 1 patient is in ICU and no patients are on intermediate care. 1,693 analyses were made on the day.

13 September 2020: 28 new cases are confirmed. The number of infected people rises to 1,808. The number of recoveries rises to 1,513, 1 patient is in ICU and no patient are on intermediate care. 1,149 analyses were made on the day.

14 September 2020: 5 new cases are confirmed. The number of infected people rises to 1,812 . The number of recoveries rises to 1,528, 1 patient is in ICU and no patient are on intermediate care. 3,394 analyses were made on the day.

15 September 2020: 15 new cases are confirmed. The number of infected people rises to 1,827. The number of recoveries rises to 1,545, 1 patient is in ICU and no patient are on intermediate care. 1,797 analyses were made on the day.

16 September 2020: 29 new cases are confirmed. The number of infected people rises to 1,856. The number of recoveries rises to 1,559, 1 patient is in ICU and no patient are on intermediate care. 2,046 analyses were made on the day.

17 September 2020: 20 new cases are confirmed. The number of infected people rises to 1,876. The number of recoveries rises to 1,582, 0 patient is in ICU and no patient are on intermediate care. 3,015 analyses were made on the day. The death of a 77-year-old man in Montevideo was also confirmed, raising the total number of deaths to 46.

18 September 2020: 15 new cases are confirmed. The number of infected people rises to 1,890, which is one less than the previous cumulative number due to one infected person being a foreigner who tested positive in Uruguay and later left the national territory. The number of recoveries rises to 1,603, 0 patient is in ICU and no patient are on intermediate care. 1,906 analyses were made on the day.

19 September 2020: 14 new cases are confirmed. The number of infected people rises to 1,904. The number of recoveries rises to 1,612, 0 patient is in ICU and no patient is on intermediate care. 1,357 analyses were made on the day.

20 September 2020: 13 new cases are confirmed. The number of infected people rises to 1,917. The number of recoveries rises to 1,621, 0 patient is in ICU and no patient is on intermediate care. 1,345 analyses were made on the day.

21 September 2020: 10 new cases are confirmed. The number of infected people rises to 1,927. The number of recoveries rises to 1,634, 0 patient is in ICU and no patient is on intermediate care. 3,457 analyses were made on the day.

22 September 2020: 7 new cases are confirmed. The number of infected people rises to 1,934. The number of recoveries rises to 1,645, 2 people are in ICU and no patient is on intermediate care. 1,881 analyses were made on the day.

23 September 2020: 12 new cases are confirmed. The number of infected people rises to 1,946. The number of recoveries rises to 1,661, 2 people are in ICU and no patient is on intermediate care. 3,074 analyses were made on the day. The death of a 63-year-old woman in Montevideo was also confirmed, raising the total number of deaths to 47.

24 September 2020: 13 new cases are confirmed. The number of infected people rises to 1,959. The number of recoveries rises to 1,679, 2 people are in ICU and no patient is on intermediate care. 3,009 analyses were made on the day.

25 September 2020: 8 new cases are confirmed. The number of infected people rises to 1,967. The number of recoveries rises to 1,710, 2 people are in ICU and no patient is on intermediate care. 1,481 analyses were made on the day.

26 September 2020: 31 new cases are confirmed. The number of infected people rises to 1,998. The number of recoveries rises to 1,716, 2 people are in ICU and no patient is on intermediate care. 2,532 analyses were made on the day.

27 September 2020: 10 new cases are confirmed. The number of infected people rises to 2,008. The number of recoveries rises to 1,728, 2 people are in ICU and no patient is on intermediate care. 1,183 analyses were made on the day. On the day the municipal elections were held, in which 2.3 million voters were called to the polls, to vote, across the country, 19 intendants, 589 ediles, 125 mayors and 500 councilors. Because of this, sanitary measures were implemented: the mandatory use of face masks; the maintenance of social distancing; not licking the voting envelope, among others.

28 September 2020: 2 new cases are confirmed. The number of infected people rises to 2,010. The number of recoveries rises to 1,755, 2 people are in ICU and no patient is on intermediate care. 2,841 analyses were made on the day.

29 September 2020: 23 new cases are confirmed. The number of infected people rises to 2,033. The number of recoveries rises to 1,771, 3 people are in ICU and no patient is on intermediate care. 1,543 analyses were made on the day. The death of a 76-year-old man in Montevideo was also confirmed, raising the total number of deaths to 48.

30 September 2020: 15 new cases are confirmed. The number of infected people rises to 2,046, which is two less than the previous cumulative number due to two infected people being foreigners who tested positive in Uruguay and later left the national territory. The number of recoveries rises to 1,791, 3 people are in ICU and no patient is on intermediate care. 2,353 analyses were made on the day.

October 
1 October 2020: 15 new cases are confirmed. The number of infected people rises to 2,061. The number of recoveries rises to 1,809, 3 patients are in ICU and 2 patients are on intermediate care. 2,661 analyses were made on the day.

2 October 2020: 36 new cases are confirmed. The number of infected people rises to 2,097. The number of recoveries rises to 1,824, 2 patients are in ICU and 1 patient are on intermediate care. 3,220 analyses were made on the day.

3 October 2020: 25 new cases are confirmed. The number of infected people rises to 2,122. The number of recoveries rises to 1,831, 2 patients are in ICU and 1 patient is on intermediate care. 3,061 analyses were made on the day.

4 October 2020: 26 new cases are confirmed. The number of infected people rises to 2,145, which is three less than the previous cumulative number due to two infected people being foreigners who tested positive in Uruguay and later left the national territory. The number of recoveries rises to 1,844, 3 patients are in ICU and 1 patient is on intermediate care. 1,569 analyses were made on the day.

5 October 2020: 10 new cases are confirmed. The number of infected people rises to 2,155. The number of recoveries rises to 1,862, 3 patients are in ICU and 2 patients are on intermediate care. 1,970 analyses were made on the day.

6 October 2020: 23 new cases are confirmed. The number of infected people rises to 2,177, which is one less than the previous cumulative number due to an infected person being a foreigner who tested positive in Uruguay and later left the national territory. The number of recoveries rises to 1,878, 2 patients are in ICU and 1 patient is on intermediate care. 2,625 analyses were made on the day. The death of an 82-year-old man in Montevideo was also confirmed, raising the total number of deaths to 49.

7 October 2020: 29 new cases are confirmed. The number of infected people rises to 2,206. The number of recoveries rises to 1,890, 1 patient is in ICU and no patients are on intermediate care. 2,819 analyses were made on the day.

8 October 2020: 21 new cases are confirmed. The number of infected people rises to 2,226, which is one less than the previous cumulative number due to an infected person being a foreigner who tested positive in Uruguay and later left the national territory. The number of recoveries rises to 1,904, 2 patients are in ICU and no patients are on intermediate care. 2,597 analyses were made on the day.

9 October 2020: 25 new cases are confirmed. The number of infected people rises to 2,251. The number of recoveries rises to 1,917, 2 patients are in ICU and no patients are on intermediate care. 2,995 analyses were made on the day.

10 October 2020: 17 new cases are confirmed. The number of infected people rises to 2,268. The number of recoveries rises to 1,930, 2 patients are in ICU and no patients are on intermediate care. 2,720 analyses were made on the day. The death of a 77-year-old man in Montevideo was also confirmed, raising the total number of deaths to 50.

11 October 2020: 27 new cases are confirmed. The number of infected people rises to 2,294, which is one less than the previous cumulative number due to an infected person being a foreigner who tested positive in Uruguay and later left the national territory. The number of recoveries rises to 1,942, 2 patients are in ICU and no patients are on intermediate care. 1,595 analyses were made on the day.

12 October 2020: 20 new cases are confirmed. The number of infected people rises to 2,313, which is one less than the previous cumulative number due to an infected person being a foreigner who tested positive in Uruguay and later left the national territory. The number of recoveries rises to 1,950, 1 patients is in ICU and no patients are on intermediate care. 2,340 analyses were made on the day. The death of a 93-year-old man in Montevideo was also confirmed, raising the total number of deaths to 51.

13 October 2020: 23 new cases are confirmed. The number of infected people rises to 2,337. The number of recoveries rises to 1,987, 1 patient is in ICU and no patients are on intermediate care. 1,813 analyses were made on the day.

14 October 2020: 51 new cases are confirmed, being a record. The number of infected people rises to 2,388. The number of recoveries rises to 2,007, 1 patient is in ICU and no patients are on intermediate care. 2,540 analyses were made on the day.

15 October 2020: 29 new cases are confirmed. The number of infected people rises to 2,417. The number of recoveries rises to 2,025, 2 patients are in ICU and no patients are on intermediate care. 2,825 analyses were made on the day.

16 October 2020: 34 new cases are confirmed. The number of infected people rises to 2,450, which is one less than the previous cumulative number due to a case being mistakenly tested positive by a health provider. The number of recoveries rises to 2,042, 2 patients are in ICU and 2 patients are on intermediate care. 2,954 analyses were made on the day.

17 October 2020: 51 new cases are confirmed. The number of infected people rises 2,501. The number of recoveries rises to 2, 052, 3 patients are in ICU and 2 patients are on intermediate care. 2,601 analyses were made on the day.

18 October 2020: 30 new cases are confirmed. The number of infected people rises to 2,531. The number of recoveries rises to 2,105, 4 patients are in ICU and 2 patients are on intermediate care. 2,089 analyses were made on the day.

19 October 2020: 30 new cases are confirmed. The number of infected people rises to 2,560, which is one less than the previous cumulative number due to an infected person being a foreigner who tested positive in Uruguay and later left the national territory. The number of recoveries rises to 2,121, 5 patients are in ICU and a patient is on intermediate care. 2,655 analyses were made on the day.

20 October 2020 64 new cases are confirmed, being a new record. The number of infected people rises to 2,623, which is one less than the previous cumulative number due to an infected person being a foreigner who tested positive in Uruguay and later left the national territory. The number of recoveries rises to 2,142, 6 patients are in ICU and a patient is on intermediate care. 2,679 analyses were made on the day. The death of a 69-year-old man from Montevideo was also confirmed, raising the total number of deaths to 52.

21 October 2020: 44 new cases are confirmed. The number of infected people rises to 2,663, which is four less than the previous cumulative number due to four infected people being foreigners who tested positive in Uruguay and later left the national territory. The number of recoveries rises to 2,172, 7 patients are in ICU and a patient is on intermediate care. 3,512 analyses were made on the day. The death of a 65-year-old man from Rivera was also confirmed, raising the total number of deaths to 53.

22 October 2020  38 new cases are confirmed. The number of infected people rises to 2,701. The number of recoveries rises to 2,204, 7 patients are in ICU and a patients is on intermediate care 2,430 analyses were made on the day.

23 October 2020: 59 new cases are confirmed, 6 of them are military personnel who returned from a peacekeeping mission in the Democratic Republic of Congo. The number of infected people rises to 2,759, which is one less than the previous cumulative number due to an infected person being a foreigner who tested positive in Uruguay and later left the national territory. The number of recoveries rises to 2,241, 8 patients are in ICU and 2 patients are on intermediate care. 3,054 analyses were made on the day.

24 October 2020: 48 new cases are confirmed. The number of infected people rises to 2,807. The number of recoveries rises to 2,301, 9 patients are in ICU and a patient is on intermediate care. 3,621 analyses were made on the day.

25 October 2020: 48 new cases are confirmed. The number of infected people rises to 2,851, which is four less than the previous cumulative number due to four infected people being foreigners who tested positive in Uruguay and later left the national territory. The number of recoveries rises to 2,351, 11 patients are in ICU and a patient is on intermediate care. 3,134 analyses were made on the day.

26 October 2020: 24 new cases are confirmed. The number of infected people rises to 2,872, which is three less than the previous cumulative number due to three infected people being foreigners who tested positive in Uruguay and later left the national territory. The number of recoveries rises to 2,411, 11 patients are in ICU and a patient is on intermediate care. 2,481 analyses were made on the day. The death of an 88-year-old woman from Montevideo was also confirmed, raising the total number of deaths to 54.

27 October 2020: 44 new cases are confirmed. The number of infected people rises to 2,916. The number of recoveries rises to 2,455, 8 patients are in ICU and a patient is on intermediate care. 2,438 analyses were made on the day.

28 October 2020: 65 new cases are confirmed. The number of infected people rises to 2,981. The number of recoveries rises to 2,481, 9 patients are in ICU and a patient is on intermediate care. 3,710 analyses were made on the day. The death of a 77-year-old man from Montevideo was also confirmed, raising the total number of deaths to 55.

29 October 2020: 63 new cases are confirmed. The number of infected people rises to 3,044. The number of recoveries rises to 2,504, 11 patients are in ICU and a patient is on intermediate care. 3,857 analyses were made on the day. The deaths of a 69-year-old man from Rivera and of an 87-year-old from Montevideo were also confirmed, raising the total number of deaths to 57.

30 October 2020: 39 new cases are confirmed. The number of infected people rises to 3,082, which is one less than the previous cumulative number due to an infected person being a foreigner who tested positive in Uruguay and later left the national territory. The number of recoveries rises to 2,532, 11 patients are in ICU and no patients are on intermediate care. 2,696 analyses were made on the day. The death of a 79-year-old man was also confirmed, raising the total number of deaths to 58.

31 October 2020: 42 new cases are confirmed. The number of infected people rises to 3,124. The number of infected people rises to 2,560, 10 patients are in ICU and a patient in on intermediate care. 3,073 analyses were made on the day. The Ministry of Public Health released a statement exhorting citizens not to go out for trick-or-treating or to hold parties during Halloween.

November 
1 November 2020: 25 new cases are confirmed. The number of infected people rises to 3,149. The number of recoveries rises to 2,601, 10 patients are in ICU and a patient is on intermediate care. 3,341 analyses were made on the day. The death of a 78-year-old woman from Montevideo was also confirmed, raising the total number of deaths to 59.

2 November 2020: 16 new cases are confirmed. The number of infected people rises to 3,165. The number of recoveries rises to 2,658, 9 patients are in ICU and a patient is on intermediate care. 1,214 analyses were made on the day. The death of a 76-year-old patient from Rivera was also confirmed, raising the total number of deaths to 60.

3 November 2020: 31 new cases are confirmed. The number of infected people rises to 3,196. The number of recoveries rises to 2,727, 6 patients are in ICU and 2 patients are on intermediate care. 2,650 analyses were made on the day. The death of a 72-year-old man from Montevideo was also confirmed, raising the total number of deaths to 61.

4 November 2020: 49 new cases are confirmed, 18 of them are of an outbreak in the Military Academy. The number of infected people rises to 3,245. The number of recoveries rises to 2,770, 5 patients are in ICU and 2 patients are on intermediate care. 3,081 analyses were made on the day.

5 November 2020: 64 new cases are confirmed. The number of infected people rises to 3,309. The number of recoveries rises to 2,814, 6 patients are in ICU and 1 patient is on intermediate care. 3,271 analyses were made on the day.

6 November 2020: 61 new cases are confirmed. The number of infected people rises to 3,370. The number of recoveries rises to 2,853, 6 patients are in ICU and 3 patients are on intermediate care. 3,043 analyses were made on the day.

7 November 2020: 72 new cases are confirmed. The number of infected people rises to 3,441. The number of recoveries rises to 2,903, 7 patients are in ICU and 3 patients are on intermediate care. 2,935 analyses were made on the day.

8 November 2020: 73 new cases are confirmed. The number of infected people rises to 3,514. The number of recoveries rises to 2,943, 8 patients are in ICU and 2 patients are on intermediate care. 4,226 analyses were made on the day. The death of a 64-year-old patient from Montevideo was confirmed, raising the total to 62.

9 November 2020: 47 new cases are confirmed. The number of infected people rises to 3,560. The number of recoveries rises to 2,993, 10 patients are in ICU and 1 patient is on intermediate care. 2,994 analyses were made on the day.

10 November 2020: 60 new cases are confirmed. The number of infected people rises to 3,620. The number of recoveries rises to 3,034, 10 patients are in ICU and 1 patient is on intermediate care. 3,285 analyses were made on the day.

11 November 2020: 80 new cases are confirmed. The number of infected people rises to 3,700. The number of recoveries rises to 3,078, 8 patients are in ICU and 1 patient is on intermediate care. 4,341 analyses were made on the day. The death of a 90-year-old man in Montevideo was also confirmed raising the total number of deaths to 63.

12 November 2020: 95 new cases are confirmed. The number of infected people rises to 3,795. The number of infected people rises to 3,103, 8 patients are in ICU and a patient is on intermediate care. 3,802 analyses were made on the day.

13 November 2020: 88 new cases are confirmed. The number of infected people rises to 3,883. The number of recoveries rises to 3,135, 10 patients are in ICU and a patient is on intermediate care. 3,183 analyses were made on the day. The death of a 92-year-old woman was also confirmed, raising the total number of deaths to 64.

14 November 2020: 74 new cases are confirmed. The number of infected people rises to 3,957. The number of recoveries rises to 3,175, 10 patients are in ICU and a patient is on intermediate care. 4,604 analyses were made on the day.

15 November 2020: 73 new cases are confirmed. The number of infected people rises to 4,030. The number of recoveries rises to 3,233, 10 patients are in ICU and a patient is on intermediate care. 3,829 analyses were made on the day. The death of an 88-year-old woman in Montevideo was also confirmed, raising the total number of deaths to 65.

16 November 2020: 74 new cases are confirmed. The number of infected people rises to 4,104. The number of recoveries rises to 3,284, 11 patients are in ICU and a patient is on intermediate care. 2,807 analyses were made on the day. The deaths of an 82-year-old patient and of an 89-year-old were confirmed, raising the total number of deaths to 67.

17 November 2020: 104 new cases are confirmed. The number of infected people rises to 4,208. The number of recoveries rises to 3,348, 12 patients are in ICU and a patient is on intermediate care. 4,128 analyses were made on the day. The death of a 91-year-old man in Montevideo was also confirmed, raising the total number of deaths to 68.

18 November 2020: 88 new cases are confirmed. The number of infected people rises to 4,296. The number of recoveries rises to 3,404, 9 patients are in ICU and a patient is on intermediate care. 5,087 analyses were made on the day.

19 November 2020: 82 new cases are confirmed. The number of infected people rises to 4,377. The number of recoveries rises to 3,479, 9 patients are in ICU and a patient is on intermediate care. 3,555 analyses were made on the day. The death of a 67-year-old woman in Rivera was also confirmed, raising the total number of deaths to 69.

20 November 2020: 100 new cases are confirmed. The number of infected people rises to 4,477. The number of recoveries rises to 3,547, 9 patients are in ICU and a patient is on intermediate care. 4,739 analyses were made on the day.

21 November 2020: 87 new cases are confirmed. The number of infected people rises to 4,564. The number of recoveries rises to 3,621, 9 patients are in ICU and a patient is on intermediate care. 3,927 analyses were made on the day.

22 November 2020: 136 new cases are confirmed. The number of infected people rises to 4,699. The number of recoveries rises to 3,679, 12 patients are in ICU and a patient is on intermediate care. 4,735 analyses were made on the day. The deaths of a 86-year-old patient from Montevideo and a 63-year-old patient from Rivera were confirmed, raising the total number of deaths to 71.

23 November 2020: 71 new cases are confirmed. The number of infected people rises to 4,763, which is seven fewer than the sum of today's new cases and the previous total due to seven foreign nationals having tested positive and left the country. The number of recoveries rises to 3,764, 14 patients are in ICU and no patients are on intermediate care. 2,131 analyses were made on the day.

24 November 2020: 108 new cases are confirmed. The number of infected people rises to 4,870, which is one fewer than the sum of today's new cases and the previous total due to a foreign national having tested positive and left the country. The number of recoveries rises to 3,827, 13 patients are in ICU and no patients are on intermediate care. 5,003 analyses were made on the day. The death of a 55-year-old healthcare worker from Canelones was confirmed, raising the total number of deaths to 72.

25 November 2020: 118 new cases are confirmed. The number of infected people rises to 4,988. The number of recoveries rises to 3,923, 12 patients are in ICU and no patients are on intermediate care. 5,763 analyses were made on the day. The death of a 79-year-old patient from Montevideo was confirmed, raising the total number of deaths to 73.

26 November 2020: 129 new cases are confirmed. The number of infected people rises to 5,117. The number of recoveries rises to 4,021, 11 patients are in ICU and no patients are on intermediate care. 3,830 analyses were made on the day. The death of a 73-year-old patient from Salto was confirmed, raising the total number of deaths to 74.

27 November 2020: 186 new cases are confirmed. The number of infected people rises to 5,303. The number of recoveries rises to 4,107, 12 patients are in ICU and no patients are on intermediate care. 4,329 analyses were made on the day.

28 November 2020: 208 new cases are confirmed. The number of infected people rises to 5,511. The number of recoveries rises to 4,185, 15 patients are in ICU and no patients are on intermediate care. 3,912 analyses were made on the day. The death of a 66-year-old patient from Cerro Largo was confirmed, raising the total number of deaths to 75.

29 November 2020: 208 new cases are confirmed. The number of infected people rises to 5,716, which is three fewer than the sum of today's new cases and the previous total due to three foreign nationals having tested positive and left the country. The number of recoveries rises to 4,267, 16 patients are in ICU and one patient is on intermediate care. 5,867 analyses were made on the day. The death of a 66-year-old patient from Canelones was confirmed, raising the total number of deaths to 76.

30 November 2020: 149 new cases are confirmed. The number of infected people rises to 5,857, which is eight less than the previous cumulative number due to eight infected people being foreigners who tested positive in Uruguay and later left the national territory. The number of recoveries rises to 4,357, 18 patients are in ICU and one patient is on intermediate care. 3,698 analyses were made on the day. The death of a 98-year-old patient from Montevideo was confirmed, raising the total number of deaths to 77.

December 
1 December 2020: 168 new cases are confirmed. The number of infected people rises to 6,024, which is one fewer than the previous cumulative number due to an infected person being a foreigner who tested positive in Uruguay and later left the national territory. The number of recoveries rises to 4,483, 22 patients are in ICU and no patient is on intermediate care. 3,621 analyses were made on the day. The death of a 82-year-old man from Rivera was confirmed, raising the total number of deaths to 78.

2 December 2020: 203 new cases are confirmed. The number of infected people rises to 6,225, which is two fewer than the previous cumulative number due to two infected people being foreigners who tested positive in Uruguay and later left the national territory. The number of recoveries rises to 4,584, 24 patients are in ICU and no patient is on intermediate care. 5,267 analyses were made on the day. The deaths of a 71-year-old man from Maldonado and of an 85-year-old woman from Montevideo were also confirmed, raising the total number of deaths to 80.

3 December 2020: 238 new cases are confirmed. The number of infected people rises to 6,455, which is eight fewer than the previous cumulative number due to eight infected people being foreigners who tested positive in Uruguay and later left the national territory. The number of recoveries rises to 4,707, 23 patients are in ICU and 2 patients are on intermediate car e. 5,599 analyses were made on the day.

4 December 2020: 284 new cases are confirmed. The number of infected people rises to 6,731, which is eight fewer than the previous cumulative number due to eight infected people being foreigners who tested positive in Uruguay and later left the national territory. The number of recoveries rises to 4,826, 25 patients are in ICU and 2 patients are on intermediate care. 7,473 analyses were made on the day.

5 December 2020: 235 new cases are confirmed. The number of infected people rises to 6,965, which is one fewer than the previous cumulative number due to an infected person being a foreigner who tested positive in Uruguay and later left the national territory. The number of recoveries rises to 4,946, 28 patients are in ICU and no patient is on intermediate care. 4,961 analyses were made on the day. The death of a 60-year-old woman from Soriano was also confirmed, raising the total number of deaths to 81.

6 December 2020: 339 new cases are confirmed. The number of infected people rises to 7,303, which is one fewer than the previous cumulative number due to an infected person being a foreigner who tested positive in Uruguay and later left the national territory. The number of recoveries rises to 5,062, 26 patients are in ICU and no patient is on intermediate care. 7,362 analyses were made on the day. The death of a 68-year-old woman from Canelones was also confirmed, raising the total number of deaths to 82.

7 December 2020: 207 new cases are confirmed. The number of infected people rises to 7,505, which is five fewer than the previous cumulative number due to five infected people being foreigners who testes positive in Uruguay and later left the national territory. The number of recoveries rises to 5,240, 27 patients are in ICU and no patient is on intermediate care. 4,117 analyses were made on the day. The death of a 61-year-old woman was also confirmed, raising the total number of deaths to 83.

8 December 2020: 303 new cases are confirmed. The number of infected people rises to 7,806, which is two fewer than the previous cumulative number due to two infected people being foreigners who tested positive in Uruguayn and later left the national territory. The number of recoveries rises to 5,415, 26 patients are in ICU and no patient is on intermediate care. 5,622 analyses were made on the day. The deaths of a 59-year-old patient, of a 81-year-old and of a 83-year-old were also confirmed, raising the total number of deaths to 86.

9 December 2020: 299 new cases are confirmed. The number of infected people rises to 8,104, which is one fewer than the previous cumulative number due to an infected person being a foreigner who tested positive in Uruguay and later left the national territory. The number of recoveries rises to 5,564, 28 patients are in ICU and no patient is on intermediate care. 6,353 analyses were made on the day. The death of a 82-year-old man in Montevideo was also confirmed, raising the total number of deaths to 87.

10 December 2020: 309 new cases are confirmed. The number of infected people rises to 8,487, which is seven fewer than the previous cumulative number due to seven infected people being foreigners who tested positive in Uruguay and later left the national territory. The number of recoveries rises to 5,747, 33 patients are in ICU and no patient is on intermediate care. 6,385 analyses were made on the day. The deaths of a 61-year-old patient, of a 89-year-old patient and of a 97-year-old patient were also confirmed, all from Montevideo, raising the total number of deaths to 90.

11 December 2020: 365 new cases are confirmed. The number of infected people rises to 8,849, which is three fewer than the previous cumulative number due to three infected people being foreigners who tested positive in Uruguay and later left the national territory. The number of recoveries rises to 5,941, 37 patients are in ICU and no patient is on intermediate care. 6,045 analyses were made on the day.

12 December 2020: 337 new cases are confirmed. The number of infected people rises to 9,180, which is six fewer than the previous cumulative number due to six infected people being foreigners who tested positive in Uruguay and later left the national territory. The number of recoveries rises to 6,155, 40 patients are in ICU and no patient is on intermediate care. 6,669 analyses were made on the day. The death of a 79-year-old patient from Montevideo was also confirmed, raising the total number of deaths to 91.

13 December 2020: 533 new cases are confirmed. The number of infected people rises to 9,708, which is five fewer than the previous cumulative number due to five infected people being foreigners who tested positive in Uruguay and later left the national territory. The number of recoveries rises to 6,358, 38 patients are in ICU and no patient is on intermediate care. 6,658 analyses were made on the day. The deaths of a 91-year-old patient from Montevideo was also confirmed, raising the total number of deaths to 92.

14 December 2020: 332 new cases are confirmed. The number of infected people rises to 10,029, which is eleven fewer than the previous cumulative number due to eleven infected people being foreigners who tested positive in Uruguay and later left the national territory. The number of recoveries rises to 6,593, 38 patients are in ICU and no patient is on intermediate care. 4,875 analyses were made on the day. The deaths of three patients were also confirmed, all from Montevideo, raising the total number of deaths to 95.

15 December 2020: 400 new cases are confirmed. The number of infected people rises to 10,418, which is eleven fewer than the previous cumulative number due to eleven infected people being foreigners who tested positive in Uruguay and later left the national territory. The number of recoveries rises to 6,895, 42 patients are in ICU and no patient is on intermediate care. 6,267 analyses were made on the day. The deaths of three patients were also confirmed, two from Montevideo and one from Soriano, raising the total number of deaths to 98.

16 December 2020: 476 new cases are confirmed. The number of infected people rises to 10,893, which is one fewer than the previous cumulative number due to one infected person being a foreigner who tested positive in Uruguay and later left the national territory. The number of recoveries rises to 7,142, 44 patients are in ICU and no patient is on intermediate care. 7,410 analyses were made on the day. The deaths of four patients were also confirmed, all from Montevideo, raising the total number of deaths to 102.

17 December 2020: 547 new cases are confirmed. The number of infected people rises to 11,436, which is four fewer than the previous cumulative number due to four infected people being foreigners who tested positive in Uruguay and later left the national territory. The number of recoveries rises to 7,406, 44 patients are in ICU and no patient is on intermediate care. 8,695 analyses were made on the day. The deaths of three patients were also confirmed, two from Montevideo and one from Artigas, raising the total number of deaths to 105.

18 December 2020: 520 new cases are confirmed. The number of infected people rises to 11,950, which is six fewer than the previous cumulative number due to six infected people being foreigners who tested positive in Uruguay and later left the national territory. The number of recoveries rises to 7,699, 44 patients are in ICU and no patient is on intermediate care. 7,177 analyses were made on the day. The deaths of four patients were also confirmed, two from Montevideo, one from Canelones, and one from Rivera, raising the total number of deaths to 109.

19 December 2020: 610 new cases are confirmed. The number of infected people rises to 12,557, which is three fewer than the previous cumulative number due to three infected people being foreigners who tested positive in Uruguay and later left the national territory. The number of recoveries rises to 8,002, 49 patients are in ICU and no patient is on intermediate care. 8,249 analyses were made on the day. The deaths of five patients were also confirmed, three from Montevideo and two from Canelones, raising the total number of deaths to 114.

20 December 2020: 497 new cases are confirmed. The number of infected people rises to 13,048, which is six fewer than the previous cumulative number due to six infected people being foreigners who tested positive in Uruguay and later left the national territory. The number of recoveries rises to 8,327, 55 patients are in ICU and no patient is on intermediate care. 6,553 analyses were made on the day. The deaths of five patients were also confirmed, three from Montevideo, one from Rivera, and one from Artigas, raising the total number of deaths to 119.

21 December 2020: 441 new cases are confirmed. The number of infected people rises to 13,447, which is 12 fewer than the previous cumulative number due to 12 infected people being foreigners who tested positive in Uruguay and later left the national territory. The number of recoveries rises to 8,688, 59 patients are in ICU and no patient is on intermediate care. 5,950 analyses were made on the day.

22 December 2020: 526 new cases are confirmed. The number of infected people rises to 14,001, which is two fewer than the previous cumulative number due to two infected people being foreigners who tested positive in Uruguay and later left the national territory. The number of recoveries rises to 9,127, 59 patients are in ICU and no patient is on intermediate care. 7,374 analyses were made on the day. The death of a 75-year-old patient from Montevideo was also confirmed, raising the total number of deaths to 120.

23 December 2020: 712 new cases are confirmed. The number of infected people rises to 14,710, which is three fewer than the previous cumulative number due to three infected people being foreigners who tested positive in Uruguay and later left the national territory. The number of recoveries rises to 9,574, 59 patients are in ICU and no patient is on intermediate care. 10,892 analyses were made on the day. The deaths of eight patients were also confirmed, one from Canelones, one from Tacuarembó, and six from Montevideo, raising the total number of deaths to 128.

24 December 2020: 754 new cases are confirmed. The number of infected people rises to 15,457, which is seven fewer than the previous cumulative number due to seven infected people being foreigners who tested positive in Uruguay and later left the national territory. The number of recoveries rises to 10,040, 63 patients are in ICU and no patient is on intermediate care. 13,346 analyses were made on the day. The deaths of seven patients were also confirmed, one from San José, one from Rivera, two from Durazno, and three from Montevideo, raising the total number of deaths to 135.

25 December 2020: 391 new cases are confirmed. The number of infected people rises to 15,848. The number of recoveries rises to 10,479, 62 patients are in ICU and no patient is on intermediate care. 6,215 analyses were made on the day. The deaths of eight patients were also confirmed, one from Canelones, one from Durazno, one from Río Negro, and five from Montevideo, raising the total number of deaths to 143.

26 December 2020: 371 new cases are confirmed. The number of infected people rises to 16,218, which is one fewer than the previous cumulative number due to one infected person being a foreigner who tested positive in Uruguay and later left the national territory. The number of recoveries rises to 10,847, 71 patients are in ICU and no patient is on intermediate care. 3,353 analyses were made on the day. The deaths of four patients were also confirmed, one from Maldonado, one from Artigas, and two from Montevideo, raising the total number of deaths to 147.

27 December 2020: 512 new cases are confirmed. The number of infected people rises to 16,728, which is two fewer than the previous cumulative number due to two infected people being foreigners who tested positive in Uruguay and later left the national territory. The number of recoveries rises to 11,366, 63 patients are in ICU and no patient is on intermediate care. 6,992 analyses were made on the day. The deaths of 11 patients were also confirmed, one from Cerro Largo, one from Rivera, one from Soriano, one from Tacuarembó and seven from Montevideo, raising the total number of deaths to 158.

28 December 2020: 585 new cases are confirmed. The number of infected people rises to 17,306, which is seven fewer than the previous cumulative number due to seven infected people being foreigners who tested positive in Uruguay and later left the national territory. The number of recoveries rises to 11,966, 74 patients are in ICU and no patient is on intermediate care. 5,423 analyses were made on the day. The deaths of two patients were also confirmed, one from Montevideo and one from Rocha, raising the total number of deaths to 160.

29 December 2020: 657 new cases are confirmed. The number of infected people rises to 17,962, which is one fewer than the previous cumulative number due to one infected person being a foreigner who tested positive in Uruguay and later left the national territory. The number of recoveries rises to 12,506, 74 patients are in ICU and no patient is on intermediate care. 7,137 analyses were made on the day. The deaths of eight patients were also confirmed, one from Rivera, two from Canelones and five from Montevideo, raising the total number of deaths to 168.

30 December 2020: 519 new cases are confirmed. The number of infected people rises to 18,480, which is one fewer than the previous cumulative number due to one infected person being a foreigner who tested positive in Uruguay and later left the national territory. The number of recoveries rises to 12,996, 74 patients are in ICU and no patient is on intermediate care. 7,410 analyses were made on the day. The deaths of six patients were also confirmed, two from Canelones and four from Montevideo, raising the total number of deaths to 174.

31 December 2020: 644 new cases are confirmed. The number of infected people rises to 19,119. The number of recoveries rises to 13,468, 72 patients are in ICU and no patient is on intermediate care. 6,779 analyses were made on the day. The deaths of seven patients were also confirmed, five from Montevideo, one from Canelones and one from Rivera, raising the total number of deaths to 181.

References 

2020 in Uruguay
Disease outbreaks in Uruguay
 2020